Yokotani Tameike Dam is an earthfill dam located in Tottori prefecture in Japan. The dam is used for irrigation. The catchment area of the dam is 0.5 km2. The dam impounds about 4  ha of land when full and can store 182 thousand cubic meters of water. The construction of the dam was completed in 1952.

References

Dams in Tottori Prefecture
1952 establishments in Japan